Aleuria aurantia (orange peel fungus) is a widespread ascomycete fungus in the order Pezizales. The brilliant orange, cup-shaped ascocarps often resemble orange peels strewn on the ground, giving this species its common name.

Taxonomy
Christiaan Hendrik Persoon described the orange peel as Peziza aurantia in 1800. The specific epithet is the Latin word aurantia "orange". Karl Wilhelm Gottlieb Leopold Fuckel placed it the genus Aleuria in 1870.

Description
The orange fruiting body is 2–10 cm wide, cup-shaped, often misshapen due to crowding from other fruiting bodies. The spores are colorless and scatter in visible clouds when disturbed.

It is generally regarded as edible, though difficult to collect intact and not necessarily choice, with no particularly notable North American lookalikes.

In Europe, the orange peel may be confused with species of Otidea or Caloscypha which are poisonous or of unknown edibility.

Similar species include Caloscypha fulgens, Sarcoscypha coccinea, Sowerbyella rhenana, and members of Otidea and Peziza.

Distribution and habitat
The orange peel fungus grows on bare clay or disturbed soil throughout North America and Europe. It has also been found in the south of Chile. Aleuria aurantia fruits mainly in late summer and autumn.

References

Further reading
Nilsson, S. & Persson, O. 1977. Fungi of Northern Europe 1: Larger Fungi (Excluding Gill Fungi). Penguin Books.
Yao, Y.-J., and B. M. Spooner. 1995. Notes on British taxa referred to Aleuria. Mycological Research 99:1515-1518.
Seaver, F. J. 1914. North American species of Aleuria and Aleurina. Mycologia 6:273-278.

Pyronemataceae
Edible fungi
Fungi of Europe
Fungi described in 1794
Taxa named by Christiaan Hendrik Persoon
Fungi of North America